The 1933 Duke Blue Devils football team represented the Duke Blue Devils of Duke University during the 1933 college football season. Hall of Famer Fred Crawford was a consensus All-American this year; the first from North Carolina.

Duke upset Robert Neyland's Tennessee Volunteers 10 to 2. It was Tennessee's first loss in over two and a half seasons. It caused Neyland to say of Crawford: "He gave the finest exhibition of tackle play I have ever seen."

Schedule

References

Duke
Duke Blue Devils football seasons
Southern Conference football champion seasons
Duke Blue Devils football